This is an international list of diarists who have Wikipedia pages and whose journals have been published.

A

B

C

D

E

F

G

H

I

J

K

L

M

N

O

P

Q

R

S

T

U

V

W

Y

Z

Diaries of disputed authenticity
The Black Diaries purportedly written by Roger Casement and detailing his alleged homosexual activities, are believed by some to be a forgery perpetrated by the British government.

See also
List of Australian diarists of World War I
List of dream diaries
List of fictional diaries

References

Lists of writers